BLV may refer to:

bovine leukemia virus
Scott Air Force Base/MidAmerica St. Louis Airport in Belleville, Illinois (IATA Code: BLV)
Bavarian Localbahn Society, heritage railway operator
BLV Verlag, German publisher